Louis Vigée (2 February 1715 – 9 May 1767) was a French portraitist, fan painter, artist in pastels and a member of the Académie de Saint-Luc.

In 1750, he married Jeanne Vigeé. In 1755, Jeanne gave birth to their first child Élisabeth Louise Vigée, whom became a painter, and in 1758, Jeanne gave birth to their second child Étienne Vigée, whom became a playwright and man of letters.

External links
http://www.artnet.com/artist/644753/louis-vigee.html

1715 births
1767 deaths
18th-century French painters
French male painters
Louis
18th-century French male artists